Sir Philip Hales, 5th Baronet (c. 1735-12 April 1824), of Beakesbourne in Kent, was an English courtier and Member of Parliament.

Hales was the sixth son of Sir Thomas Hales, 3rd Baronet, a long-serving Member of Parliament who held a series of lucrative posts in the Royal Household. He also held a household post, as Groom of the Bedchamber from 1771 until 1812.

In 1774 he stood for election in two constituencies, Canterbury and Downton. At Canterbury he was badly defeated, but Downton was a pocket borough where his brother-in-law Lord Feversham was influential, and he was successful there, though only after petitioning against the original result; he took his seat in February 1775. He later also served as MP for Marlborough. He is not recorded as having spoken in the House in either of his two periods as an MP.

His father's baronetcy had passed to his elder brother, Thomas Pym Hales, in 1762. However, when his brother died on 18 March 1773, his only children were daughters, so Philip as the oldest surviving brother inherited the title. He married Elizabeth Smith, pre 1784, but their only child was also a daughter, Elizabeth. On Philip's death in 1824 he had no male heirs, and the baronetcy became extinct.

References
 
 Hales genealogy
 Robert Beatson, A Chronological Register of Both Houses of Parliament (London: Longman, Hurst, Res & Orme, 1807) 
 Lewis Namier & John Brooke, The History of Parliament: The House of Commons 1754–1790 (London: HMSO, 1964)

|-

Hales, Philip
Hales, Philip, 5th Baronet
Hales, Philip
Year of birth uncertain
British MPs 1774–1780
British MPs 1784–1790
People from Bekesbourne